María Alicia Lemme (born 1954) is an Argentine Peronist politician. She became Vice Governor of San Luis Province in 1999, deputising for Adolfo Rodríguez Saá, and became Governor of San Luis upon Rodríguez Saá's resignation in 2001. Notably, Lemme was the first-ever female governor of an Argentine province. Lemme also served as mayor of two cities in San Luis: Juana Koslay (from 1991 to 1997) and the City of San Luis (from 2007 to 2011).

Born in Villa Mercedes, San Luis Province, Lemme became an architect by profession and served as Mayor of Juana Koslay (1991–97), and in the Provincial Legislature (1997–99). She was elected Vice-Governor of the Province alongside Adolfo Rodríguez Saá in 1999. Rodríguez Saá's appointment as President of Argentina by Congress in December 2001 left Lemme the governorship. She was the first female governor since the restoration of democracy.

Lemme stepped down in 2003, allowing Alberto Rodríguez Saá to stand for election to the Governorship formerly held by his brother Adolfo. Later that year, she and Adolfo were elected as National Deputies.

In 2006, Lemme took a leave of absence from Congress. She was elected as Mayor of San Luis in August 2007 with just over 50% of the vote defeating incumbent Mayor Alfonso Vergés, the candidate of the Front for Victory of then President Néstor Kirchner.

References

1954 births
Living people
People from Villa Mercedes, San Luis
Argentine people of Italian descent
Justicialist Party politicians
Members of the Argentine Chamber of Deputies elected in San Luis
Governors of San Luis Province
Women mayors of places in Argentina
Women members of the Argentine Chamber of Deputies
Women governors of provinces of Argentina